Scopula benigna  is a moth of the family Geometridae. It is endemic to Iran.

Subspecies
Scopula benigna benigna (Iran)
Scopula benigna nigromaculata (Hausmann, 1994)

References

Endemic fauna of Iran
Moths described in 1941
Moths of the Middle East
benigna